Anthony Conwell (17 January 1932 – 6 May 2017) was an English professional footballer who made 281 appearances in the Football League playing as a right back for Sheffield Wednesday, Huddersfield Town, Derby County and Doncaster Rovers. Conwell died in hospital on 6 May 2017, aged 85.

References

1932 births
2017 deaths
English footballers
Association football defenders
Sheffield Wednesday F.C. players
Huddersfield Town A.F.C. players
Derby County F.C. players
Doncaster Rovers F.C. players
English Football League players
Footballers from Bradford